Northbridge is a suburb on the Lower North Shore of Sydney, New South Wales, Australia. It is located 6 kilometres north of the Sydney Central Business District, in the local government area of the City of Willoughby.

The Suspension Bridge, linking the suburb to Cammeray, has become a recognised symbol of Northbridge, completed in January 1892 and purchased by the state government in 1912.

The suburb celebrated its centenary in 2013.

History
Northbridge took its name from its location, north of a sandstone suspension bridge built in 1892. The bridge was constructed by a team of land developers at a cost of A£42,000 and originally known as North Sydney Bridge. The engineer responsible for the construction was J. E. Coyle and the style was Federation Gothic, with medieval motifs as "unexpected embellishments". It has been known as the Northbridge and Cammeray Suspension Bridge but is now called the Long Gully Bridge.

The land where the suspension bridge was built belonged to William Twemlow, a Sydney jeweler. In 1868 he purchased the land extending from Fig Tree Point to the head of Long Bay, (now Northbridge). He initially regarded the land as valueless but changed his mind when he made a handsome profit by selling some of it to an English syndicate who built the suspension bridge. Twemlow decided to build a two-storey home called The Hermitage, on Fig Tree Point, from sandstone quarried on the estate, which took a year to cut. As this was the first house built in this locality, transport was a problem and Twemlow had to sail through The Spit and around Middle Head to Circular Quay, from where he walked to his shop at Sydney Arcade.

Northbridge Post Office opened on 25 November 1920.

Since that time, Northbridge has maintained a number of Federation-style detached houses.

Heritage listings

Commercial area

Northbridge Plaza is a shopping centre managed by AMP Capital for two overseas owners. It is located on the corner of Eastern Valley Way and Sailors Bay Road, and it features a Woolworths supermarket, groceries, a butchery, a bakery, a chemist, and a range of specialty shops.

Northbridge is also home to several cafes and wine stores, including those at Bond's Corner (voted Australia's best wine store 2013 and 2014). Bond's Corner is a heritage listed building.

Transport
Bus routes 202, 203, 207, 208 and 209 from Bridge Street, in the Sydney CBD, travel through Northbridge via North Sydney. Peak hour bus routes 204, 205 and 206 operates to city via freeway instead. Forest Coach lines also operates bus route 194 to Wynyard and Town Hall via Warringah Freeway. A bus stop is located at the major intersection between Strathallen Avenue and Sailors Bay Road.

At the 2011 census, 22% of employed people travelled to work on public transport and 52% by car (either as driver or as passenger).

Schools
 Northbridge Public School: Northbridge's government primary school, 'committed to the provision of the highest quality education'. Founded in 1923, the school has a population of over 500, and has hosted events of national significance including the launch of the "Australian of the Year Awards" 2003 and a helicopter visit from the Crown Prince and Princess of Japan in 2005. 
 St Philip Neri School: the suburb's Catholic school, part of the Broken Bay Diocese. The school is on the same site as the Catholic Church.
 Sydney Church of England Grammar School (SHORE): the school's playing fields and preparatory school are located at the westernmost end of Northbridge.

Parks
Northbridge has a vantage point over Middle Harbour with the harbourside parks (Clive, Elizabeth And Hallstrom Parks) all offering great views.
Elizabeth Park (Coolawin Road)
Clive Park (Minimbah Road): with tables, harbour views, barbecue facilities, swings, and bathroom facilities.
Hallstrom Point Park (Hallstrom Close)
John Roche Playground (Roche Lane, off Woonona Road): playground, junior bike track
Tunks Park (Brothers Avenue): barbecues, playing fields, boat ramp, gym equipment, playground, bush tracks, extensive parking.
Warners Park (Jack McLure Place): shelters, playground, bowling club, parking
Northbridge Bike Skills Track (Sailors Bay Road): A small bike track with two jump lines and a large berm.

Northbridge features an 18-hole harbour view golf course, soccer club, sailing club, marina, salt water baths, scout hall, girl guides, tennis courts, parks, ovals, local reserves and bike track. The Bond's Corner bike track was designed and created by a group of friends who believed Northbridge needed an area that appealed to the increasing bike riding population of the town. The nearby Willoughby Leisure Centre is easily accessible through Small Street or a nearby track.

Clubs and societies 
 Norths Pirates Junior Rugby Union Club is the local village Rugby Club, the former Club being known as Cambridge Bay. This Club taking its name from Northbridge, Cammeray and Neutral Bay. The Pirates home ground is located at Tunks Park which is below the famous bridge.
 Northbridge Sailing Club (NSC) faces Middle Harbour and can be accessed through Minimbah Road. Partnered with Seaforth Sailing Club, races are held on Sundays. The club offers boat storage, a canteen and a launching pontoon.
 Northbridge Cricket Club (NCC) founded in 1919, is the oldest surviving cricket club in the Northern Suburbs Cricket Association (NCSA). Fielding 6 teams in 2017-18 across a number of grades and caters for players of various abilities, with the emphasis on competition, participation and enjoyment. NCC has raised a potential player base of 150 people who regularly play cricket for the club. Off the field the club has an active social calendar and regularly hold social events for all the family. In 2018/19 the club celebrated its centenary season. 
 Northbridge Football Club
 Northbridge Netball Club
 1st Northbridge Scout Troop located by Northbridge oval.

Demographics
As of the 2016 census, the suburb of Northbridge recorded a population of 6,347.  Of these:
 The median age was 42 years, compared to the national median of 38 years, children aged under 15 years made up 22.4% of the population (national average is 18.7%) and people aged 65 years and over made up 18.4% of the population (national average is 15.8%).
 More than two-thirds (67.8%) were born in Australia. The next most common countries of birth were England 5.3%, China mainland and Hong Kong 4.9%, Japan 1.9% and New Zealand 1.8%.
 78.1% of people only spoke English at home. Other languages spoken at home included Mandarin 3.6%, Cantonese 3.4% and Japanese 2.2%.
 The most common responses for religion were No Religion 29.4%, Catholic 28.3% and Anglican 19.2%.
 Of occupied private dwellings in Northbridge 76.6% were separate houses, 14.2% were flats or apartments and 8.3% were semi-detached. The average household size was 3 people.
 Aboriginal and Torres Strait Islander people made up 0.1% of the population of Northbridge.

Notable residents 
Several notable Australians live in Northbridge including former NSW Premier Gladys Berejiklian, former rugby league champions Laurie Daley and Jason Taylor, former Wallabies player Phil Waugh, Seven News presenter and journalist Chris Reason and Australian journalist Kathryn Robinson.

The composer Dulcie Holland and her conductor husband Alan Bellhouse both lived in Kameruka Road in Northbridge until their deaths. 

Former Australian prime minister Bob Hawke purchased a waterfront property in Northbridge shortly before the end of his tenure and resided there until his death in 2019.

References

, Local council website

External links

 Roads and Traffic Authority Heritage and Conservation Register listing for Long Gully Bridge

Suburbs of Sydney
City of Willoughby